Nolan Andres Sotillo (born October 2, 1994) is an American Entertainer with versatile talent who has found success on stage and screen. After discovering his love for entertaining during his childhood in West Palm Beach, FL, Sotillo tested out of high school and moved to LA to pursue his dream full time. Over the course of his career, the singer, songwriter, multi-instrumentalist, and actor has attracted a fervent fan base via a series of independent releases and high-profile roles. He starred in numerous projects including Disney’s Prom to FOX’s Red Band Society (produced by Steven Spielberg.) Even as a successful actor, Sotillo never gave up on his songwriting passion and continued to make music when he wasn’t busy on set. Today, with a full-time focus on music, Sotillo has been in the studio writing and recording. With a sound that encompasses intimate ballads, timeless country anthems, the spirit of rock, the bounce of funk, and the universality of pop –Sotillo has cultivated his own sound that showcases his depth and versatility.  

Sotillo’s latest releases ’’Run with You’,  ‘Prove Me Wrong’   & ‘Stop’ from his newest album, ‘At The End Of The Day’, released October 22, 2021, with AMG Records, LLC.

Sotillo starred as Jordi Palacios in the Fox drama series Red Band Society, which premiered September 17, 2014.

Sotillo was part of Invasion, a teen musical group.  The group included Mathias Anderle, Kenton Duty, John Lindahl, and Nick Dean.

Discography

Studio albums

Extended plays

Singles

Promotional singles

Other appearances

Filmography

References

External links
 

1994 births
Living people
21st-century American male actors
American people of Cuban descent
American male film actors
American male television actors
Guitarists from Florida
American male guitarists
21st-century American male singers
21st-century American singers
21st-century American guitarists
American male singer-songwriters
Singer-songwriters from Florida